The Russell 1000 Index is a stock market index that tracks the highest-ranking 1,000 stocks in the Russell 3000 Index, which represent about 93% of the total market capitalization of that index. , the stocks of the Russell 1000 Index had a weighted average market capitalization of $381.3 billion and a median market capitalization of $12.2 billion. , components ranged in market capitalization from $1.8 billion to $1.4 trillion. The index, which was launched on January 1, 1984, is maintained by FTSE Russell, a subsidiary of the London Stock Exchange Group.

The ticker symbol is ^RUI. There are several exchange-traded funds and mutual funds that track the index.

Record values

Annual returns

Top sectors by weight
Technology
Health Care
Industrials
Consumer Discretionary
Financials

Top 10 holdings
Apple
Microsoft
Amazon
Berkshire Hathaway
Alphabet (Class A)
UnitedHealth Group
Alphabet (Class C)
Johnson & Johnson
ExxonMobil
JPMorgan Chase

(as of December 31, 2022)

Components
Components as of October 24, 2022 are:

See also
Russell Investments
Russell 3000 Index
Russell 2000 Index

References

External links
FTSE/Russell home page
Index Construction and Methodology

1000_Index
American stock market indices